

Route

Bristol to Bridgwater
West Harptree | Charterhouse | Wookey Hole | Glastonbury

The route goes south from Bristol into Somerset and around Chew Valley Lake

Bridgwater to Land's End

Taunton | Bideford | Bude | Bodmin

See also
 The Cornish Way Bude to Bodmin section

References

Transport in Bristol
Cycling in Somerset
Transport in Devon
Transport in Cornwall
National Cycle Routes